Ae Jugara Krushna Sudama is a 2003 Oriya-language film, directed by Hara Patnaik, starring Mithun Chakraborty and Uttam Mohanty. It is a remake of Hindi-language film Khudgarz which itself was based on Jeffrey Archer's 1979 novel Kane and Abel.

Plot
Ae Jugara Krushna Sudama is the story of the love and friendship between a wealthy person named Uttam Mohanty and a poor person Mithun Chakraborty.

Snippets
Ae Jugara Krushna Sudama was a box office success and it was Mithun's second Oriya movie after his special appearance in Sahara Jaluchi that was released in 1998.

Cast
Mithun Chakraborty
Uttam Mohanty
Anita Das

References

External links

Odia remakes of Hindi films
2000s Odia-language films
Films directed by Hara Patnaik